In Greek mythology, Megaletor is a minor figure, a prince of the Molossians, who was transformed into a bird by the will of Zeus, the god of justice, in order to escape a fiery death.

Family 
Philaeus was one of the sons of the Molossian king Munichus by his wife Lelante. He had two brothers, Alcander and Philaeus, and a sister named Hyperippe.

Mythology 
The entire family was seen as just and righteous and therefore especially favored by the gods. One day raiders attacked them in the fields; the family ran off to their house and began to throw various objects at them in self-defense, whereupon the offenders set the house ablaze. The god of justice, Zeus would not let his favourites suffer such a cruel and undeserving death that he changed them all six of them into various birds in order to save them from the flames; Megaletor himself was changed into a 'ichneumon bird', a bird that is very hard to say what it could be identified with.

See also 

 Artemiche
 Erodius
 Hippodamia

References

Bibliography 
 Antoninus Liberalis, The Metamorphoses of Antoninus Liberalis translated by Francis Celoria (Routledge 1992). Online version at the Topos Text Project.
 
 Ovid, Metamorphoses, Volume II: Books 9-15. Translated by Frank Justus Miller. Revised by G. P. Goold. Loeb Classical Library 43. Cambridge, MA: Harvard University Press, 1916.

Deeds of Zeus
Princes in Greek mythology
Metamorphoses into birds in Greek mythology
Epirotic mythology